Reasonable Doubt (also known as The Good Samaritan) is a 2014 Canadian-German crime thriller film directed by Peter Howitt and written by Peter A. Dowling. The film stars Samuel L. Jackson, Dominic Cooper, Erin Karpluk, Gloria Reuben and Ryan Robbins. It received generally negative reviews from critics.

Plot
While driving home in a state of intoxication after celebrating winning a court case, ambitious young Chicago District Attorney Mitch Brockden (Dominic Cooper) is accidentally involved in a fatal hit and run. In an effort to preserve his legal career, he covers it up. Clinton Davis (Samuel L. Jackson), a 55-year-old car mechanic (whose wife and child had been killed in a home invasion by a parolee) is arrested for the murder, and has reported ties to a series of other unexplained crimes. Brockden becomes the prosecutor for the case and ensures that Davis is acquitted for the crime. After another man is mysteriously murdered in a similar manner as previous unsolved cases soon after Davis' release, Brockden and Det. Blake Kanon (Gloria Reuben) suspect that Davis is a serial killer who murders parolees in an attempt to prevent them committing further crimes.

Brockden searches Davis' house for evidence to prove his suspicions. At the same time, his stepbrother Jimmy Logan (Ryan Robbins) tails Davis to a warehouse. While on the phone with Brockden, Logan is attacked by Davis leaving him in a coma. Brockden is arrested by the police and while in custody, Davis threatens to kill Brockden's wife (Erin Karpluk). He breaks out of prison to stop him. In a confrontation, Brockden is wounded by Davis, but is saved when Detective Kanon fatally shoots Davis. During the aftermath, Brockden introduces Logan to his wife and infant daughter.

Cast
 Dominic Cooper as Mitch Brockden
 Samuel L. Jackson as Clinton Davis
 Erin Karpluk as Rachel Brockden
 Gloria Reuben as Det. Blake Kanon
 Ryan Robbins as Jimmy Logan
 Dylan Taylor as Stuart Wilson
 Karl Thordarson as Cecil Akerman
 Dean Harder as Terry Roberts
 Carson Nattrass as Officer Travis
 John B. Lowe as Judge G. Mckenna
 Philippe Brenninkmeyer as DA Jones
 Jessica Burleson as Secretary
 Kelly Wolfman as Dr. Brown

Production
The production of the film began on November 19, 2012 and shot in Winnipeg, Canada. It was also filmed in Chicago and shot over 27 days. Its production budget was $8 million.

Release
In May 2013, Lionsgate Films picked up the rights of distribution in the United States and Voltage Pictures distributed the film internationally.

Reception
Reasonable Doubt received generally negative reviews. As of June 2020, Rotten Tomatoes, a review aggregator, surveyed eight reviews and judged one review to be positive.  Jeannette Catsoulis of The New York Times commented that the plotting was "indifferent", the direction was "flaccid" and that Dominic Cooper's portrayal of a flawed hero failed to capture the audience's sympathy. Gary Goldstein of the Los Angeles Times called the film "contrived and predictable". Scott Foundas of Variety magazine wrote that the film was made "...with all the enthusiasm of a career middle-manager dutifully punching a clock." Frank Scheck of The Hollywood Reporter felt the film wasted the time of the audience and commented that Cooper never elicited the audience's sympathy for his character.

Notes

References

External links

 

English-language Canadian films
Films shot in Manitoba
Films shot in Chicago
Films directed by Peter Howitt
Lionsgate films
Mandate Pictures films
2014 crime thriller films
Canadian crime thriller films
English-language German films
Entertainment One films
2014 films
Voltage Pictures films
2010s English-language films
2010s Canadian films